Brother of Mine is the fourth young adult novel by English writer Chris Westwood. It was first published in the UK by Viking Kestrel (part of the Penguin Group and in the US by Clarion Books in 1994.

Reviews 

Junior Bookshelf: Nick and Tony are twins. It is not a situation they enjoy. Each thinks the other is against him. They share the same persistent dream of an antagonism in the shared womb of their mother where their rivalry for existence seems to have had its origin. They may be identical in appearance but not in disposition. Each gets lumbered with the misdemeanours of the other. When it comes to girls they are not averse to playing the part of the other twin in person or over the telephone.

Stories involving twins often stress the humour of such situations but with Nick and Tony they aggravate the mutual hatred. As Tony reads in a book "For years the two brothers waged war — and all because of a terrible misunderstanding." They are both in the fifth form at school when this antagonism reaches a desperate climax which brings them to the realisation that unless they face this mutual misunderstanding it will end in total disaster for both them and their girl-friends.

The author has chosen to present this story in alternate chapters in which each twin speaks in the first person narrating the events from his point of view. Sometimes they overlap and sometimes they move into a new area. This seems to present the reader with four characters to cope with. There is Nick himself and Nick as seen by Tony and vice versa. The two girls, Nicki and Alexandra, address Tony as Nick and Nick as Tony in between talking to the right person. The reader has to concentrate hard to find out what is going on. This may mean re-reading parts of the text again and again and then perhaps from start to finish before grasping the true brilliance of the author's handling of so complex a literary technique.

It may be possible to skate lightly over the narration of the events with all their plausibility but the book will only yield its true worth to the reader who has acquired or been taught the real art and skill of reading. There is the danger that less mature readers will be too daunted by the book's structure to give it the close reading it so richly deserves. The theme may be adolescent but its presentation invites comparison with novels that have made their way into the accepted canons of distinction.

Books For Keeps: Robert Swindells wrote: "I'm a Stephen King fan and Chris Westwood comes as close to matching the Master as any writer I know." Now I had to read Stephen King when students of mine, usually those reluctant to read, chose to write their GCSE Open Studies on horror books - I didn't particularly enjoy the experience.

Chris Westwood I read willingly, but admit that his most recent novel, Brother of Mine, to do with the horror that can build up in a real relationship rather than with haunting, murder or possession, is for me by far his best book. Readers of 12+ won't all agree with me and will find the suspense and horror of Calling All Monsters, A Light In The Black and Personal Effects chilling and compulsive. The writing is powerful and the plots original and well-sustained as the books rush to sometimes shocking endings - as in Calling All Monsters.

For me Brother of Mine really demonstrates how much Chris Westwood has developed as a writer as he explores the relationship of twin brothers, trapped by their similarity and by their differences into a hatred of each other. When Tony meets Nick's girlfriend and allows her to believe he's his brother, the hatred grows and Nick looks for revenge. Alternate chapters tell the story from both points of view and at times, like Alex and Vicky, I found it hard not to confuse the two. This is a well-shaped novel, shockingly realistic and very disturbing; its high quality offers promise of even better to come.

References

1993 British novels
Novels by Chris Westwood
1990s horror novels
British young adult novels
Novels about siblings
Twins in fiction
Clarion Books books
Viking Press books